The 38th Wisconsin Infantry Regiment was a volunteer infantry regiment that served in the Union Army during the American Civil War.

Service
The 38th Wisconsin was organized at Madison, Wisconsin, and mustered into Federal service on April 15, 1864. The regiment was mustered out on July 26, 1865.

Casualties
The 38th Wisconsin suffered 1 officer and 56 enlisted men killed or fatally wounded in action and 56 enlisted men who died of disease, for a total of 113 fatalities.

Commanders
 Colonel James Bintliff (April 15, 1864June 27, 1865) mustered out.  Received an honorary brevet to brigadier general.
 Lt. Colonel Colwert K. Pier (June 27, 1865July 26, 1865) was designated colonel after the resignation of Colonel Bintliff, but was never mustered at that rank.  He was the first American child born at what is now Fond du Lac, Wisconsin, the son of Edward Pier.

Notable people
 Courtland P. Larkin, the son of Charles H. Larkin, was major of the regiment.  
 Solon Pierce was 1st lieutenant in Co. K.  After the war he served as a Wisconsin legislator.
 Anson Rood was quartermaster for the regiment.  After the war he served as a Wisconsin legislator.

See also

 List of Wisconsin Civil War units
 Wisconsin in the American Civil War

References

Further reading

External links
Wisconsin - 38th Regiment Infantry at Civil War Archive

Military units and formations established in 1864
Military units and formations disestablished in 1865
Units and formations of the Union Army from Wisconsin
1864 establishments in Wisconsin